The Fairview Ski Hill is a ski area located about 15 km southwest of the Town of Fairview, Alberta, Canada.  It has a rope tow, 2 platters and one T-bar and 15 runs. They offer  of groomed runs on 100% natural snow. There is skiing and snowboarding for everyone, no matter ability.  The Fairview Ski Hill has lessons available for beginners, a terrain park for the snowboarders and many special events throughout the season.

The hill was incorporated as a non-profit organization in 1970 and heavily relied on volunteer and community support. Volunteers continue to assist in projects and it is still run by a volunteer board.

Facilities

Fully Equipped Day Lodge

Rental Shop
 large selection of Salomon parabolic skis
 wide range of snowboards

Concession
 variety of meals, snacks & drinks
 daily specials

Lift system

See also
List of ski areas and resorts in Canada

References
 http://www.skifairview.com

External links
 Official Website
 Facebook Page

Municipal District of Fairview No. 136
Ski areas and resorts in Alberta